"Tennessee" a song by American hip hop group Arrested Development, released in March 1992 as the first single from their debut album, 3 Years, 5 Months & 2 Days in the Life Of... (1992). The song contains a sample of Prince's 1988 hit "Alphabet St.". It peaked at number six in the United States and won the Grammy Award for Best Rap Performance by a Duo or Group in 1993. A 2007 poll of VH1 viewers placed the song at number 71 on the list of the "Greatest Songs of the 90s" and is listed as one of the "500 Songs That Shaped Rock and Roll" by the Rock and Roll Hall of Fame. It was also ranked number 78 on VH1's "100 Greatest Songs of Hip Hop". The song served as the theme to the short-lived Malcolm-Jamal Warner 1992 sitcom Here and Now.

Background
Group member Speech was inspired to write the song after meeting up with his brother at his grandmother's funeral in Tennessee. Shortly afterward, his brother died suddenly from a bad asthma attack, and Speech wrote the song about the experience of losing two loved ones so close together.

"Tennessee" uses a sample from Prince's "Alphabet St." that was not cleared ahead of time. Prince's lawyers waited until after the song sold well and then charged the group $100,000 for the use of said sample. Speech later said he felt Prince gave him "a break" by demanding a single payment instead of co-writing credit on the song, which would have entitled Prince to a share of all royalties in the future.

Chart performance
"Tennessee" topped the US Billboard Hot R&B/Hip-Hop Singles & Tracks for one week and peaked at number six on the Billboard Hot 100. In the United Kingdom, the song spent seven weeks on the UK Singles Chart, peaking at number 46, but after the top ten successes of both "People Everyday" and "Mr. Wendal" on the chart, it was re-released in 1993, charting for a further six weeks and peaking at number 18.

Critical reception
Larry Flick from Billboard wrote, "Melodic, sing-song rap possesses a modern spiritual quality. Female vocalist Dionne adds heavy, soulful element to the proceedings. Socially relevant, thought-provoking lyrics lead listener into a hook-driven, memorable chorus. Track has a unique appeal and would add a new dimension to the average urban playlist." Clark and DeVancey from Cash Box said that Arrested Development "straight blew up on the scene" with "Tennessee", noting its "rapping-while-singing approach". James Bernard from Entertainment Weekly felt the lyrics of the song "resonate like Speech's most private thoughts, betraying his desperate moments." Robert Hilburn from Los Angeles Times wrote, "Some of pop’s best moments come from groups that seem to arrive from nowhere with a confidence and mature vision--and that’s the case here. The Georgia rap group tries in this graceful, spiritually-tinged song to reconcile life’s blessings with social injustice." Another editor, Chris Willman, remarked that it "may go down in the history books as the first major sad rap hit. Not bitter, not raging or recriminatory, just flat-out, soul-and-heaven-searchingly heartsick." In his weekly UK chart commentary, James Masterton stated, "The group who seemingly can do no wrong at present notch up their third hit." 

Jim Arundel from Melody Maker said, "It's quite brilliant. Another step forward for rap." Andy Beevers from Music Week gave it five out of five and named it Pick of the Week in the category of Dance, complimenting it as "arguably the best track on the LP". Parry Gettelman from Orlando Sentinel felt the album's "killer single", "Tennessee", "has a simple, irresistible melodic hook, a lazy beat that recalls hot afternoons and amazingly complex lyrics." A reviewer from People Magazine found that "the half-sung, half-rapped delivery of the band’s leader, Speech (Todd Thomas), suggests a hayride with Sly Stone and Prince on the buckboard." James Hamilton from the RM Dance Update described it as a "familiar jiggly roller". Pete Stanton from Smash Hits also gave the song five out of five, writing, "Slip on some dungarees, chew on a length of straw and groove your groovy bits with the yokels down on the farm. The Development's infectious rap is taking us over and no one is struggling to get free. This track [...] starts with a "Ten-Ten-Ten-Tennessee" and is followed by a bumping, grinding and a dash of groove. They are without doubt the greatest rap outfit about at the mo."

Music video
The accompanying music video for the song was directed by New York-based Macedonian film director, photographer and artist Milcho Manchevski. It was shot in Georgia, with friends of the group and people from the local area appearing in the clip.

Impact and legacy
Slant Magazine listed "Tennessee" at number 98 in their ranking of "The 100 Best Singles of the 1990s" in 2011, writing, "Perhaps no other track from the early ‘90s provided better (or catchier) proof that hip-hop was more versatile and capable than prevailing gangster-rap themes than Arrested Development’s "Tennessee", its stuttering drumline ably providing a clean backdrop for expositions on civil rights, genealogical discovery, Southern culture, the devastating legacy of slavery, and the nature of God. A pained but uplifting narrative struggles at times to catch up with the song's driving gait, but "Tennessee" satisfies nonetheless, mixing raw, percussive power, quirky sampling, and inspirational imagery into one cerebral whole."

Bob Dylan played the song on the "Tennessee" episode of the first season of his Theme Time Radio Hour show in 2006, noting that Arrested Development had "kind of updated the Sly and the Family Stone sound for the hip-hop generation”.

A 2007 poll of VH1 viewers placed it at number 71 on the "Greatest Songs of the 90s" list and was also ranked as one of the "500 Songs That Shaped Rock and Roll" by the Rock and Roll Hall of Fame. It was also listed at number 78 on VH1's "100 Greatest Songs of Hip Hop". The song served as the theme to the short-lived Malcolm-Jamal Warner sitcom Here and Now.

Track listings
 UK CD
 "Tennessee" (edit) 		
 "Tennessee" (remix) 		
 "Fishin 4 Religion" (live) 		
 "Mama's Always on Stage"

 Australia maxi-CD
 "Tennessee" (remix) – 4:48 	
 "Tennessee" (For DJs Only) – 2:18 	
 "Tennessee" (Dubb mix) – 4:45 	
 "Natural" – 4:19

 US maxi-CD
 "Tennessee" (The Mix) – 4:33 	
 "Tennessee" (remix) – 4:40 	
 "Tennessee" (For DJs Only) – 2:15 	
 "Tennessee" (Dubb mix) – 4:40 	
 "Natural" – 4:19

Charts

Weekly charts

Year-end charts

Certifications

Release history

See also
 List of number-one R&B singles of 1992 (U.S.)

References

External links
 

1992 debut singles
1992 songs
Arrested Development (group) songs
Chrysalis Records singles
Comedy television theme songs
Cooltempo Records singles
Prince (musician)
Commemoration songs
Songs involved in royalties controversies